Camino del Amor (The Road of Love) is a studio album released by Los Temerarios. This final album included all 5 original members, Mario Alberto Ortiz departs from the band in 1996. Karlo Vidal replaces Mario Alberto Ortiz as the new drummer in 1997.

Track list
All songs were composed by Adolfo Angel Alba. But one song is composed by Gustavo Angel Alba.

"Como Tu" – 3:55 
"Cuando Fuiste Mia" – 4:24
"La Mujer de Los Dos" – 5:00
"Sin Ti Moriria" (Gustavo Angel Alba) – 4:07
"Ahi Estare Yo" – 3:19
"Mi Alma Reclama" – 4:54
"Eres un Angel" – 4:39
"Todo Me Recuerda a Ti" – 3:36
"Pobre Tonto Enamorado" – 3:38
"Una Guitarra Llora" – 4:09

Personnel 

Carlos Abrego – percussion
Mario Alberto Ortiz - drums
Manrique Moheno Aguilar – executive coordinator
Mario Alanis – engineer
Adolfo Ángel Alba – arranger, keyboards, vocals, mastering, mixing
Gustavo Ángel Alba – guitar, vocals
Javier Alfaro – violin
Carlos Anadon – photography
Javier Carrillo – violin
Jaime Cavazos – engineer, mastering, mixing
Alejandro Ceballos – violin
Jose Antonio Farias – backing vocals
Fernando Gonzalez – bass
Manrique Moheno – executive coordinator
Keko "Antroposofico" Mota – assistant engineer
Enrique Ramos – violin
Adriana Rebold – graphic design, art direction
Jorge Ruiz – guitar, trumpet, violin, director
Luis Vega – mastering, mixing
Miguel Viurquis – trumpet

Sales and certifications

References

Los Temerarios albums
1995 albums
Fonovisa Records albums